Methanogen homoaconitase (methanogen HACN) is an enzyme with systematic name (R)-2-hydroxybutane-1,2,4-tricarboxylate hydro-lyase ((1R,2S)-1-hydroxybutane-1,2,4-tricarboxylate-forming). This enzyme catalyses the following chemical reaction

 (R)-2-hydroxybutane-1,2,4-tricarboxylate  (1R,2S)-1-hydroxybutane-1,2,4-tricarboxylate (overall reaction)
 (1a) (R)-2-hydroxybutane-1,2,4-tricarboxylate  (Z)-but-1-ene-1,2,4-tricarboxylate + H2O
 (1b) (Z)-but-1-ene-1,2,4-tricarboxylate + H2O  (1R,2S)-1-hydroxybutane-1,2,4-tricarboxylate

This enzyme catalyses several reactions in the pathway of coenzyme-B biosynthesis in methanogenic archaea.

References

External links 
 

EC 4.2.1